Trichophaea woolhopeia is a species complex of ectomycorrhizal fungi belonging to the family Pyronemataceae. There are at least 4 well-resolved cryptic species within the complex, including Quercirhiza quadratum and AD (Angle Droit).  They are European species that appear on damp ground, with apothecial fruiting bodies that appear as tiny (up to 6 mm across) whitish cups with brown hairs on the margin and outer surface.

References

Trichophaea woolhopeia at Species Fungorum
Trichophaea woolhopeia at GBIF

Pyronemataceae
Fungi described in 1875
Taxa named by Mordecai Cubitt Cooke